The Copa 2015 MX Clausura was the 73rd staging of the Copa MX, the 46th staging in the professional era and is the sixth tournament played since the 1996–97 edition.

This tournament started on January 20, 2015 and ended April 21, 2015.

Puebla won their fifth title after defeating Guadalajara 4–2 in the final.

Participants Clausura 2015
This tournament will feature the clubs from the Liga MX who did not participate in the 2014-15 CONCACAF Champions League (León, América, Pachuca and Cruz Azul), and the teams who will participate in the 2015 Copa Libertadores (UANL, Atlas and Morelia) will not participate as well. The first 13 Ascenso MX teams in the classification phase during the Apertura 2014 season will participate.

Tiebreakers

If two or more clubs are equal on points on completion of the group matches, the following criteria are applied to determine the rankings:

 superior goal difference;
 higher number of goals scored;
 scores of the group matches played among the clubs in question;
 higher number of goals scored away in the group matches played among the clubs in question;
 best position in the Relegation table;
 fair play ranking;
 drawing of lots.

Group stage

All but one group is composed by four clubs, two from Liga MX and two from Ascenso MX. The remaining group will have one from Liga MX and three from Ascenso MX. Instead of a traditional robin-round schedule, the clubs will play in three two-legged "rounds", the last one being contested by clubs of the same league.

Each win gives a club 3 points, each draw gives 1 point. An extra point is awarded for every round won; a round is won by aggregated score, and if it is a tie, the extra point will be not be awarded to neither team.

All times are UTC-05:00 except for matches in Sinaloa, Tepic (both UTC−06:00) and Tijuana (UTC−07:00)

Group 1

Round 1

Santos Laguna won the round 4–3 on aggregate

Teams drew 3–3 on aggregate, San Luis won the round on away goals

Round 2

Querétaro won the round 3–0 on aggregate

Santos Laguna won the round 3–0 on aggregate

Round 3

Zacatecas won the round 5–4 on aggregate

Querétaro won the round 7–2 on aggregate

Group 2

Round 1

Veracruz won the round 2–1 on aggregate

UAT won the round 2–1 on aggregate

Round 2

UAT won the round 3–2 on aggregate

Monterrey won the round 9–0 on aggregate

Round 3

UAT won the round 4–3 on aggregate

Monterrey won the round 4–1 on aggregate

Group 3

Round 1

Tepic won the round 3–0 on aggregate

Tijuana originally won the first leg 3–1 but Tijuana was later awarded a 3–0 win after Necaxa only had 6 registered Ascenso MX players available for the leg instead of the mandatory 8.

Tijuana won the round 6–1 on aggregate

Round 2

U de G. won the round 3–1 on aggregate

Tijuana won the round 5–4 on aggregate

Round 3

Tijuana won the round 3–1 on aggregate

Tepic won the round 4–2 on aggregate

Group 4

Round 1

Teams drew 1–1 on aggregate and tied on away goals, thus neither team received the extra point

Sinaloa won the round 3–2 on aggregate

Round 2

Guadalajara won the round 3–0 on aggregate

Sinaloa won the round 3–0 on aggregate

Round 3

Guadalajara won the round 2–0 on aggregate

BUAP won the round 6–5 on aggregate

Group 5

Round 1

Puebla won the round 3–1 on aggregate

Mérida won the round 7–1 on aggregate

Round 2

Toluca won the round 4–2 on aggregate

Puebla won the round 4–1 on aggregate

Round 3

Teams drew 4–4 on aggregate, Puebla won the round on away goals

Mérida won the round 5–2 on aggregate

Group 6

Round 1

Teams drew 3–3 on aggregate, Oaxaca won the round on away goals.

UNAM won the round 2–1 on aggregate

Round 2

Zacatepec won the round 4–3 on aggregate

Teams drew 3–3 on aggregate, UNAM won the round on away goals

Round 3

Zacatepec won the round 4–2 on aggregate

Chiapas won the round 6–1 on aggregate

Ranking of runners-up clubs

The best two runners-up advance to the Championship Stage. If two or more teams are equal on points on completion of the group matches, the following criteria are applied to determine the rankings:

 superior goal difference;
 higher number of goals scored;
 higher number of goals scored away;
 best position in the Relegation table;
 fair play ranking;
 drawing of lots.

Championship stage

The eight clubs that advance to this stage were ranked and seeded 1 to 8 based on performance in the group stage. In case of ties, the same tiebreakers used to rank the runners-up were used.

In this stage, all the rounds will be a one-off match. If a game ends in a draw, it will proceed directly to a penalty shoot-out. The highest seeded club will host each match, regardless of which division each club belongs.

Seeding

Bracket

Quarterfinals

Semifinals

Final

Top goalscorers

Source: LigaMX.net

References

External links
 Official page of Copa MX (as well as Liga MX and Ascenso MX)

2015, 2
2015 domestic association football cups
2014–15 in Mexican football